The siege of Urbinus also called Siege of Urbino or Siege of Urbinum took place in the year 538 during Justinian's Gothic War. Earlier, when John took Ariminum, he had bypassed Auximus and Urbinus which would have to be taken now to secure the road to Ravenna. The Gothic king, Witigis, had sent a man called Moras with 2.000 troops to defend the city. In the year 538, the Byzantine commander, Belisarius went to besiege the town while another strong Byzantine contingents besieged Urviventus. The forces of Narses and John, other Byzantine commanders, who were undermining Belisarius' authority, joined him in this venture. Thinking the defenders would be terrified on seeing the Byzantine army, Belisarius sent envoys offering the garrison a chance to surrender. Narses and John set up camp separately form Belisarius, on the other side of the town, and, after negotiations with the garrison failed, totally abandoned the siege. They declared taking the town impossible and moved to capture Aemilia but while Belisarius was preparing to assault the town surrendered due to the failure of its spring. Astonished by such success, Narses sent John to capture Caesena but this assault failed. John then moved to and managed to capture Forocornelius. After this siege Belisarius moved to support in the siege of Urviventus, also capturing that city shortly after.

References

Gothic War (535–554)
Urbinus
Urbinus
Urbinus
Urbino
538
Urbinus